Yes and no is a system for expressing affirmative and negative in the English language.

Yes and no may also refer to:

Books
 Yes and No (text), a 12th-century Christian text
Yes and No (novel), an 1828 novel by Lord Normanby
Yes and No (play), a 1980 play by Graham Greene
Yes and No, photobook of Japanese singer Mariko Shinoda

Music

Songs
"Yes and No", jazz tune composed by Wayne Shorter, recorded by Branford Marsalis and many others 
"Yes and No", jazz tune composed by Ken Schaphorst from After Blue
"Yes And No", by Ian Dury & the Blockheads from Laughter (Ian Dury & The Blockheads album) 1980
"Yes and No", by Ella Jenkins from Come Dance by the Ocean 1991	
"Yes and No", by Hins Cheung composed by Hins Cheung / Yao Hui Zhou from album P.S. I Love You
"Yes and No", by Venus Hum from album The Colors in the Wheel
"Yes and No (Paula)" a song by Ian Dury & the Blockheads from the 1980 album Laughter

See also 
 Yes or No (disambiguation)
 Yes, No (T-Square album), 1988